Lerotholi Letsie (1836–1905)  was the paramount chief of Basotho (modern Lesotho) from November 20, 1891 to August 19, 1905.

Leadership of Basotho
Lerotholi became leader after his father's death in 1891. In 1898, he fought and defeated his uncle somewhere near Thaba Bosiu. He remained leader until his death in 1905. His son Letsie II then became leader of the Basotho.

References

1836 births
1905 deaths
House of Moshesh
Basutoland people
People of the Basuto Gun War